The following is a list of presidents of the Landtag of Bavaria from 1819 to the present day.

List
Political Party:

See also
Bavaria
Politics of Bavaria
Landtag of Bavaria

Sources
Präsidenten von 1819 bis 1946
Balke, Hilde (2001): Die Präsidenten des bayerischen Landtags von 1946 bis 1994, Bayerische Landtag, Munich 

Presidents of the Landtag
Bavaria
Bavaria
Bavaria